Limavady Cricket Club is a cricket club in Limavady, County Londonderry, Northern Ireland, that played until 2012 in the North West Senior League.The club resigned from the league prior to the 2013 season for financial reasons and now plays junior cricket in the North West Qualifying League.

The club amalgamated with Limavady Rugby Club in 1968.

Honours
Irish Senior Cup: 3
1994, 1997, 2004
Ulster Cup:1
2008
North West Senior League: 10 (1 shared)
1961, 1976, 1994, 1995, 1996, 1997, 1998, 1999, 2000, 2009 (shared)
County Londonderry/North West Senior Cup: 10
1888, 1965, 1980, 1997, 1999, 2000, 2002, 2003, 2007, 2008

References

External links
Limavady Cricket & Rugby Football Club

Cricket clubs in County Londonderry
Limavady
Cricket clubs in Northern Ireland